The 1948 Pacific Tigers football team was an American football team that represented the College of the Pacific—now known as the University of the Pacific—as a member of the California Collegiate Athletic Association (CCAA) during the 1948 college football season. In their second season under head coach Larry Siemering, the Tigers compiled an overall record of 7–1–2 with a mark 4–1 in conference play, placing second in the CCAA. They outscored all opponents by a combined total of 356 to 147. At the end of the season, the Tigers were invited to the Grape Bowl in Lodi, California, where they tied Hardin–Simmons, 35–35.

Schedule

References

Pacific
Pacific Tigers football seasons
Pacific Tigers football